The Micropholidae are an extinct family of dissorophoid euskelian temnospondyls known from Late Carboniferous to Early Triassic strata in the United States and South Africa.

Systematics
Members of Micropholidae were historically included in Amphibamidae, but Schoch (2019) recovered Amphibamidae as paraphyletic, necessitating resurrection of Micropholidae for Micropholis and closely related taxa.

References

Dissorophoids
Prehistoric amphibian families
Permian temnospondyls
Carboniferous temnospondyls
Carboniferous amphibians of North America
Permian amphibians of North America
Triassic amphibians of North America
Mesozoic amphibians of Africa